Benson High School is a high school in Benson, Arizona, United States. It is part of the Benson Unified School District.

Notable alumni
 Chad Curtis, former MLB player (California Angels, Detroit Tigers, Los Angeles Dodgers, Cleveland Indians, New York Yankees, Texas Rangers)
 Mitch Hoopes, former NFL punter (Dallas Cowboys, San Diego Chargers, Detroit Lions)

References

Public high schools in Arizona
Schools in Cochise County, Arizona
Benson, Arizona